Alberto Luis Denegri Aspauza  (7 August 1906 – 18 May 1973) was a Peruvian football midfielder who played for Peru in the 1930 FIFA World Cup. He also played for Universitario de Deportes.

References

External links

FIFA profile

1906 births
1983 deaths
Peruvian footballers
Peru international footballers
Association football midfielders
Club Universitario de Deportes footballers
1930 FIFA World Cup players
Peruvian football managers
Peru national football team managers